Cymiphis is a genus of mites in the family Ologamasidae. There are about seven described species in Cymiphis.

Species
These seven species belong to the genus Cymiphis:
 Cymiphis cymosus (Lee, 1966)
 Cymiphis dumosus (Lee, 1966)
 Cymiphis leptosceles (Lee, 1966)
 Cymiphis mansoni (Lee, 1966)
 Cymiphis nucilis (Lee, 1966)
 Cymiphis validus (Lee, 1966)
 Cymiphis watsoni (Hirschmann, 1966)

References

Ologamasidae